S.T.U.N. Runner (Spread Tunnel Underground Network Runner) is 3D racing/shooter game released in arcades by Atari Games in 1989. The player pilots a futuristic vehicle which can exceed 900 mph, through various tunnels and courses with changing environments, hazards and enemies. S.T.U.N. Runner uses polygonal graphics for the vehicles and track, and is based on an evolution of Atari's Hard Drivin' hardware. The custom cabinet was designed to resemble the craft that the player pilots in-game.

The arcade game was released in Europe by Jaleco, and in Japan by Namco and Sega. Home ports were released for the Atari ST, Amiga, Commodore 64, Amstrad CPC, and ZX Spectrum. An Atari Lynx version was published by Atari Corporation in 1991.

Gameplay

The final goal is to reach the "Ultimate Challenge", an endless race filled with surprises, where the player must simply get as far as possible in the allotted time. Markers on the Ultimate Challenge course show the names of the five players who have traveled the farthest, who are tracked independently of the game's traditional high score table.

Twin triggers fire laser cannons mounted atop the craft, and the Start buttons double as the triggers for the Shockwave "smart bomb" weapon.

Reception
Commodore User reviewed the arcade game, giving it a 90% rating.

Legacy
S.T.U.N. Runner is included in Midway Arcade Treasures 3 for the PlayStation 2, Xbox, and GameCube. It was also released for Microsoft Windows as part of Midway Arcade Treasures Deluxe Edition in 2006.

References

Game info, Midway Arcade Treasures 3
Manual, Midway Arcade Treasures 3

External links

S.T.U.N. Runner at the Arcade History database

1989 video games
Amiga games
Amstrad CPC games
Arcade video games
Atari arcade games
Atari Lynx games
Atari ST games
Commodore 64 games
DOS games
Science fiction racing games
Namco arcade games
Sega arcade games
Vehicular combat games
Video games developed in the United States
ZX Spectrum games
Jaleco games